Seriously Red is a 2022 Australian romantic comedy film directed by Gracie Otto, starring Krew Boylan, Daniel Webber, Celeste Barber, Thomas Campbell, Todd Lasance, Jean Kittson, Bobby Cannavale and Rose Byrne.

Synopsis
After being fired from her job, a former realtor tries her hand at being a Dolly Parton impersonator.

Cast

Release
The film premiered at South by Southwest on 13 March 2022. It was released theatrically in Australia on 24 November 2022 by Roadshow Films. In July 2022, Gravitas Ventures and Lionsgate acquired North American rights to the film, with a planned release in February 10, 2023.

Reception
On the review aggregator website Rotten Tomatoes, the film holds an approval rating of 47% based on 38 reviews, with an average rating of 5.3/10. The website's consensus reads, "Manipulative and content to fall back on charmless camp for most of its runtime, Seriously Red is a serious letdown."

Dan Callahan of TheWrap praised the script and Boylan's performance. Damon Wise of Deadline Hollywood called the film "raucous but hugely enjoyable". Mae Abdulbaki of Screen Rant rated the film two out of five stars and criticised the writing while calling the performances "fantastic and engaging".

References

External links
 
 

2022 romantic comedy films
2020s Australian films
2020s English-language films
Australian romantic comedy films
Dolly Parton